Stryjno Drugie  is a village in the administrative district of Gmina Rybczewice, within Świdnik County, Lublin Voivodeship, in eastern Poland.

See also
Bujanica

References

Stryjno Drugie